Fabian Eisele (born 10 March 1995) is a German footballer who plays as a forward for FC Homburg.

Club career 
Eisele made on 26 July 2014 his debut for VfB Stuttgart II in the 3. Liga against Dynamo Dresden in a 2–1 away defeat. He replaced Marco Grüttner after 67 minutes.

For the 2015–16 season he moved to Hertha BSC II.

References

External links 
 

1995 births
Living people
Footballers from Stuttgart
German footballers
Association football forwards
VfB Stuttgart II players
Hertha BSC II players
FSV Zwickau players
1. FC Saarbrücken players
TSV Steinbach Haiger players
FC Carl Zeiss Jena players
FC 08 Homburg players
3. Liga players
Regionalliga players